Clay-water interaction is an all-inclusive term to describe various progressive interactions between clay minerals and water. In the dry state, clay packets exist in face-to-face stacks like a deck of playing cards, but clay packets begin to change when exposed to water. Five descriptive terms describe the progressive interactions that can occur in a clay-water system, such as a water mud.

(1) Hydration occurs as clay packets absorb water and swell.

(2) Dispersion (or disaggregation) causes clay platelets to break apart and disperse into the water due to loss of attractive forces as water forces the platelets farther apart.

(3) Flocculation begins when mechanical shearing stops and platelets previously dispersed come together due to the attractive force of surface charges on the platelets.

(4) Deflocculation, or peptization, the opposite effect, occurs by addition of chemical deflocculant to flocculated mud; the positive edge charges are covered and attraction forces are greatly reduced.

(5) Aggregation, a result of ionic or thermal conditions, alters the hydrational layer around clay platelets, removes the deflocculant from positive edge charges and allows platelets to assume a face-to-face structure.

See also 
 Dispersity
 Quick clay behaviour

References 

Water
Clay
Colloids
Colloidal chemistry